MacPerspective was a 3D perspective drawing program developed for the Apple Macintosh computer in 1985. It featured an intuitive system for creating "wireframe" drawings by specifying the X, Y, and Z coordinates of lines to be drawn on the screen. It was developed and distributed by B. Knick Drafting, Inc., which still retains the rights to the software. It enjoyed modest success through the early 1990s when it was still functional on System 7.

References

3D graphics software
Macintosh-only software